Zack Maynard (born March 29, 1992) is an American politician who has served in the West Virginia House of Delegates from the 22nd district since 2016.

References

1992 births
Living people
Republican Party members of the West Virginia House of Delegates
21st-century American politicians